The O'Kalems Visit Killarney is a 1912 American silent documentary produced by Kalem Company. It was directed by Sidney Olcott.

Production notes
The film was shot in Killarney, co Kerry, Ireland, during summer of 1911.

References
 Michel Derrien, Aux origines du cinéma irlandais: Sidney Olcott, le premier oeil, TIR 2013.  
 Denis Condon, Touristic Work and Pleasure: The Kalem Company in Killarney

External links

 The O'Kalems Visit Killarney website dedicated to Sidney Olcott

1912 films
American silent short films
Films set in Ireland
Films shot in Ireland
Films directed by Sidney Olcott
American black-and-white films
1912 documentary films
American documentary films
1910s American films